Hiroshi Tada (多田 宏, ただ ひろし, Tada Hiroshi) (born  December 14, 1929) is a Japanese aikido teacher holding the rank of 9th dan in the Aikikai.

Born in Tokyo within a former Samurai family, Tada first studied his family's style of archery (Heki-Ryū Chikurin-ha Ban-pa) under his father in the family's house in Jiyūgaoka. He then became a member of the Waseda University karate club before starting training in aikido at the Aikikai Hombu Dojo under aikido founder Morihei Ueshiba in March 1950. He was dispatched to Rome, Italy, in 1964 where he established the Italian Dojo Centrale in 1967, and the national association Aikikai d'Italia in 1970. He returned to Japan in 1971 to resume teaching at the Aikikai Hombu Dojo.

To supplement aikido training, he has developed a system of breathing and meditative exercises called ki no renma  (気の錬磨, cultivation of ki) based largely on the teachings of Nakamura Tempu and the Ichikukai Dojo.

References

External links 
 Aikido Tada Juku web site
 Aikikai D'Italia web site
 "The day I entered Ueshiba Dojo", by Hiroshi Tada
 Aikido Shihan Hiroshi Tada – Speaking of The Founder
 Aikido Shihan Hiroshi Tada: The Budo Body, Part 1
 Aikido Shihan Hiroshi Tada – the Yachimata Lecture, Part 1

1929 births
Japanese aikidoka
Living people
People from Tokyo